St. Clare's Convent, St. Clare's Priory, Poor Clare's Convent, Convent of Santa Clara, or other variations on the name, may refer to:

Cuba 
 Convento de Santa Clara de Asis, Havana

Denmark 
 St. Clare's Priory, Copenhagen

France 
 Poor Clare Convent (Gravelines)

Israel
 Monastery St. Claire, Jerusalem
 Monastery St. Claire, Nazareth

Mexico 
 Poor Clare convent of Mexico City, now Library of the Congress of Mexico

Peru 
 Convent of Santa Clara, Lima

Portugal 
 Convent of Santa Clara, Vila do Conde

Spain 
 Royal Convent of Santa Clara, Tordesillas
 Convent of Santa Clara of Gandia

Sweden 
 St. Clare's Priory, Stockholm

United Kingdom 
 Convent of Poor Clares, Woodchester

United States 
 St. Clare's Church (Staten Island, New York)#Convent

See also 
 St. Clare's Monastery (disambiguation)